Gordon Koang is a blind South Sudanese musician based in Australia. He is known in South Sudan as the country's "King of Music". Koang was already an internationally touring musician and a household name in his own country when he was forced to flee South Sudan for Uganda and then Australia. Since then, he has played and produced music in Australia and advocated for refugees. He was awarded permanent residency in Australia in 2019.

In September 2022, Koang announced the forthcoming release of his second studio album, Community, scheduled for release on 11 November 2022.

Biography 
Koang was born in the Nile Valley in what is now South Sudan. Koang was born blind and had few job options, but a family member introduced him to the tom in an attempt to help him feel less lonely while his family was at work. He started his musical career by playing in church in his hometown of Nasir and, in the 1990s, began writing his own music to play in the streets of Juba for crowds. He became a household name in his country, having released ten albums, touring around the world, and generating a significant following on YouTube.

Koang emigrated to Australia in 2012.

In 2013, he was touring in Canada and returned to find South Sudan in the beginnings of a tribally based civil war. He found his home destroyed and his bank account emptied by looters. As members of the Nuer ethnic group, Koang, his wife, and their children were in danger from members of the Dinka ethnic group, and fled to Uganda. Koang then went to Australia, along with his cousin and fellow musician Paul Biel. They began the Australian asylum process, believing it would be a short process and their families would be able to join them soon. This, however, was not the case.

Although Koang and Biel his cousin played live music around Australia, for some time before producing any new music, but then connected with Music in Exile, a non-profit organisation which helped refugee musicians in Australia. They released their eleventh album, Unity, in Australia. It was described as "not only a prayer for reunification with his own family – whom he hopes will be granted permission to join him soon – but also a plea on behalf of refugees everywhere" and that although it touches "upon some of the darkest elements of humanity [it] ultimately points the listener in the direction of hope".

Koang was awarded permanent residency in Australia in August 2019 and submitted paperwork to have their families join them.

Music career 
Koang sings in English, Arabic and Nuer, and plays a traditional Nuer stringed instrument called the tom or thom.

His influences range from Mohammed Wardi to Rihanna.

Discography

Albums

Awards and nominations

Australian Music Prize
The Australian Music Prize (the AMP) is an annual award of $30,000 given to an Australian band or solo artist in recognition of the merit of an album released during the year of award. They commenced in 2005.

|-
| Australian Music Prize 2020
| Unity
| Album of the Year
| 
|}

Music Victoria Awards
The Music Victoria Awards, are an annual awards night celebrating Victorian music. They commenced in 2005.

! 
|-
| rowspan="5"| 2019
|  "Stand Up (Clap Your Hands)"
| Best Song
| 
| rowspan="5"|
|-
| rowspan="4"| Gordon Koang
| Best Male Musician
| 
|-
| Best Solo Artist
| 
|-
| Breakthrough Victorian Act
| 
|-
| Best Intercultural Act
| 
|-
| rowspan="3"| 2020
| rowspan="3"| Gordon Koang
| Best Musician
| 
| rowspan="3"|
|-
| Best Solo Act
| 
|-
| Best Live Act
| 
|-
|rowspan="3"| 2021
| Unity
| Best Victorian Album
| 
|rowspan="3"|
|-
|rowspan="2"| Gordon Koang
| Best Solo Artist
| 
|-
| Arts Access Amplify Award (for Deaf and Disabled acts)
| 
|-

References

External links 
Music in Exile - Gordon Koang

South Sudanese musicians
South Sudanese diaspora
South Sudanese blind people
Nuer people
Comb lamellophones
Refugees in Australia
Living people
Year of birth missing (living people)
Blind musicians